In Greek mythology, Ambrosia was one of the three or five Hyades. She was the sister of Aesyle (Phaesyle) and Eudora, and Coronis and Polyxo.

Mythology 
Dionysos was entrusted as a child to Ambrosia and her sisters, the Hyades. Later, Lycurgus assaulted the child Dionysus who was crossing his lands on Mount Nysa, escorted by the hyades. Lycurgus pursued and killed Ambrosia during this assault while her other sisters escaped and took refuge with Thetis. As she died, she turned into a vine, trapping the murderer in her branches until the god returned.

According to another version, Ambrosia was one of the twelve daughters of Atlas and Pleione and one of five sisters (the Hyades, in Latin Sicule). At the death of their only brother, Hyas, killed by a lion (or a boar), they cried so much that, according to myths, they either turned into stars or were transformed by the moved gods, thus becoming the constellation Hyades while their brother Hyas was transformed into the constellation Aquarius.

See also 
 Hyades
 Lycurgus

Notes

References 

 Gaius Julius Hyginus, Fabulae from The Myths of Hyginus translated and edited by Mary Grant. University of Kansas Publications in Humanistic Studies. Online version at the Topos Text Project.

Hyades (mythology)
Nymphs
Metamorphoses into plants in Greek mythology
Dionysus in mythology